Zen Pinball 2 is a pinball video game developed by Zen Studios for the Wii U, PlayStation 3, PlayStation 4, Android, and PlayStation Vita. The game was announced on April 9, 2012. The first PlayStation versions were released on September 4, 2012 in North America and September 5 in Europe while the Wii U version was released on March 21, 2013 in North America and January 31, 2013 in Europe.

Zen Pinball 2 is an upgrade to the original Zen Pinball 3D. It features a new UI and an upgraded version of the game engine which improves graphics and physics. There is also a new social sharing feature which allows players to post their scores on Facebook.

Although Zen Pinball 2 is fundamentally a free download, users who already own Zen Pinball or Marvel Pinball for the PlayStation 3 are able to use all their downloadable content in the PS versions of Zen Pinball 2, which imports automatically. There were 26 tables at launch (available separately as premium DLC) each of which are available as a free trial (though packs like Marvel Pinball: Vengeance and Virtue will still have to be bought as a whole). Users who purchase a pinball table on one Sony console are able to play it for free on the other.

Features
Zen Pinball 2 is cross-platform entitled in the PlayStation versions. Any content bought are playable on both PlayStation 3, PlayStation 4 and PlayStation Vita at no extra charge.
Free trials are available for each table so players can try each table before purchasing.
Those who already own Zen Pinball or Marvel Pinball content are able to import their purchases into Zen Pinball 2 for free, receiving graphics, physics and social system upgrades at no extra cost.
Zen Pinball 2 launched with 26 different pinball tables including a mystery table based on one of PopCap's games, later revealed to be Plants vs. Zombies.
New trophies for all tables.
New social system with in-game score notifications, challenges, Facebook posting, ProScore (personal performance across all tables) and TeamScore (a combined score ranking players and their friends).
New rule sheets to help a player better understand the tables, while still providing opportunity for players to discover the secrets of the table on their own.

Reception
The game has a score of 86% on Metacritic.

Sequel
In 2017, Zen Studios released Pinball FX 3, a joint sequel to Zen Pinball 2 and Pinball FX 2 that bridged the divide between Microsoft and non-Microsoft platforms that initially existed between the first two Pinball FX games and the Zen Pinball sub-series, bringing an end to the latter.

See also
Pinball FX 2
Zen Pinball

References

2012 video games
Nintendo Network games
Pinball video games
PlayStation 3 games
PlayStation 4 games
PlayStation Network games
PlayStation Vita games
Sony Interactive Entertainment games
Video games developed in Hungary
Wii U games
Wii U eShop games
Multiplayer and single-player video games
Zen Studios games
Video games based on Marvel Comics
Video games based on South Park